One-Punch Man is a Japanese anime series based on the webcomic created by One and its subsequent manga adaptation illustrated by Yusuke Murata. Set in City Z, the story focuses on Saitama, a superhero who has grown bored as he has become so powerful that all of his battles end in a single punch. The series was directed by Shingo Natsume at Madhouse and was written by Tomohiro Suzuki. The series also features character design by Chikashi Kubota, who also served as chief animation director, and music by Makoto Miyazaki. The series aired in Japan between October 5 and December 21, 2015 and was simulcast by Daisuki and Hulu.

An original video animation was released with the tenth manga volume on December 4, 2015. Additional OVAs are included in Blu-ray Disc & DVD volumes of the series, which begin release from December 24, 2015.

The series is licensed in North America, Latin America and Oceania by Viz Media, and by Viz Media Europe in Europe, the Middle East and Africa. The series was streamed worldwide excluding Asia on Daisuki. Viz Media streamed the series on Neon Alley in North America. Kaze UK and Manga Entertainment distributes the series in the United Kingdom and Ireland, and Madman Entertainment distributes the series in Australia and New Zealand, who also streamed the series on AnimeLab. An English dub of the series began airing in the United States on Adult Swim's Toonami programming block from July 17 to October 9, 2016.

A second season was later confirmed in September 2016. The second season is animated by J.C. Staff with Chikara Sakurai replacing Shingo Natsume as director and Yoshikazu Iwanami replacing Shoji Hata as sound director. Tomohiro Suzuki, Chikashi Kubota and Makoto Miyazaki reprised their roles as series composer, character designer and music composer, respectively.

The second season aired between April 9 and July 2, 2019, while a television special aired on April 2, 2019. The second season was simulcast on Hulu in the US, on Tubi in Canada, on AnimeLab in Australia and New Zealand, and on Crunchyroll in Europe.

A 10-minute OVA was bundled with the second season's first Blu-ray Disc/DVD volume on October 25, 2019.  Two more 10-minute OVAs were bundled with the second season's second and third Blu-ray Disc/DVD volume on November 26 and December 25, 2019, respectively.  Another 10-minute OVA was bundled with the second season's fourth Blu-ray Disc/DVD volume on January 28, 2020.  The 5th OVA will be bundled with the second season's fifth Blu-ray Disc/DVD volume on February 27, 2020.

A third season was announced in August 2022.

Series overview

Episode list

Season 1 (2015)

Season 2 (2019)

OVAs

Notes

References

External links
 One-Punch Man at Crunchyroll
 

One-Punch Man episode lists
Lists of anime episodes